Iuri António Teixeira Tavares (born 8 March 2001) is a professional footballer who plays as a forward for MLS Next Pro club Crown Legacy. Born in Portugal, he plays for the Cape Verde national team.

Club career
Tavares made his professional debut for Vitória Guimarães on 21 November 2021 in a 3–2 Taça de Portugal defeat against Moreirense. He joined Estoril in August 2022.

On 31 January 2023, Tavares signed with MLS Next Pro side Crown Legacy, the second team for Major League Soccer's Charlotte FC.

International career
In March 2022, Tavares received his first call-up to Cape Verde national team for friendly matches against Guadeloupe, Liechtenstein and San Marino.

Career statistics

International

References

External links
 

2001 births
Living people
Footballers from Lisbon
Association football forwards
Cape Verdean footballers
Cape Verde international footballers
Portuguese footballers
Portuguese people of Cape Verdean descent
Vitória S.C. players
G.D. Estoril Praia players